Dennis Christopher (born Dennis Carrelli; December 2, 1955) is an American actor. He is best known for his roles in Breaking Away (1979), Fade to Black (1980), Chariots of Fire (1981), It (1990) and Django Unchained (2012). He has appeared in nearly 40 movies and made-for-television films since 1975.

Early life
Christopher was born Dennis Carrelli on December 2, 1955 in Philadelphia, Pennsylvania, to an Italian father and an Irish mother. He graduated from Monsignor Bonner High School in 1973.

Career

A chance encounter in 1972 with Federico Fellini, who was filming in Rome at the time, led to the director casting Christopher in the uncredited role of "The Hippie" in his movie Roma.
After that, Christopher worked as an assistant to the fashion designer Halston.

Christopher's breakthrough role was as Dave Stohler in the coming-of-age classic Breaking Away (1979). His performance won him the BAFTA Award for Most Promising Newcomer and the Youth in Film Award for Best Juvenile Actor in a Motion Picture, as well as garnering a Golden Globe nomination.

Christopher's other roles include American track star Charlie Paddock in Chariots of Fire (1981), as well as tragic film-buff psychopath Eric Binford in Fade to Black (1980), Damon in The Falling (1985), Nathan Flowers in A Sinful Life (1989) and Leech in Plughead Rewired: Circuitry Man II (1994). Television roles include "Jack of All Trades" in the Profiler TV series, Eddie Kaspbrak in Stephen King's It (1990), Desmond Floyd in Jake Speed (1986) and in the HBO series Deadwood.

Christopher has guest starred in two Star Trek episodes: the Star Trek: Deep Space Nine episode "The Search (Part II)" and the Star Trek: Enterprise episode "Detained". He guest-starred as the demon-sorcerer Cyvus Vail in three episodes of Angel.

He reunited with his Breaking Away "father" Paul Dooley, playing Dooley's son for a third time, in a 2003 episode of Law & Order: Criminal Intent. The two had first played father and son in Robert Altman's A Wedding (1978). In December 2006, he played Dr. Martin Ruber in the Sci Fi Channel miniseries The Lost Room.

Christopher was cast as Leonide Moguy in Quentin Tarantino's Django Unchained (2012). He learned through his agent that the screenplay had been re-written to accommodate him. Furthermore, Tarantino later told Christopher that he had seen every one of his films the week that they were released, even Dead Women in Lingerie (which Christopher considers his worst). Production of the film made a very positive impact on Christopher, who stated, "...a lot of my idea of happiness came from working on this film...".

Filmography

Film

Television

Theatre

References

External links

1955 births
Living people
20th-century American male actors
21st-century American male actors
American male film actors
American male television actors
American people of Irish descent
American people of Italian descent
BAFTA Most Promising Newcomer to Leading Film Roles winners
Male actors from Philadelphia